Krzysztof Mączyński (born 23 May 1987) is a Polish professional footballer who plays as a midfielder.

Club career
He is a trainee of Wisła Kraków. He scored his first goal for Wisła in the Ekstraklasa Cup match against Górnik Zabrze on 28 November 2007. Mączyński debuted in Ekstraklasa in the game versus Górnik Zabrze on 2 December 2007.

In August 2011, he joined Górnik Zabrze on a two-year contract.

On 8 January 2014 he signed for Guizhou Renhe.

On 7 July 2017 he signed a contract with Legia Warsaw.

International career
On 15 November 2013, Mączyński made his debut for Poland national team in an international friendly against Slovakia, coming on as a substitute for Tomasz Jodłowiec in the 76th minute.

On 14 October 2014, he scored for the first time in international competition in a Euro 2016 Qualifying game against Scotland in group D, giving Poland a 1–0 lead in the 11th minute.

In May 2018 he was named in Poland's preliminary 35-man squad for the 2018 World Cup in Russia. However, he did not make the final 23.

Career statistics

Club

International

Scores and results list Poland's goal tally first, score column indicates score after each Mączyński goal.

Honours
Wisła Kraków
 Ekstraklasa: 2007–08

Wisła Kraków (ME)
 Młoda Ekstraklasa: 2007–08

ŁKS Łódź
 I Liga: 2010–11

Guizhou Renhe
 Chinese FA Super Cup: 2014

Legia Warsaw
 Polish Cup: 2018
 Ekstraklasa: 2017–18

References

External links
 
 
 

1987 births
Living people
Polish footballers
Footballers from Kraków
Association football midfielders
Poland international footballers
UEFA Euro 2016 players
Ekstraklasa players
I liga players
II liga players
III liga players
Chinese Super League players
Wisła Kraków players
ŁKS Łódź players
Górnik Zabrze players
Beijing Renhe F.C. players
Legia Warsaw players
Śląsk Wrocław players
Polish expatriate footballers
Polish expatriate sportspeople in China
Expatriate footballers in China